"Hellbound (H&H Remix)", or simply "Hellbound", is a song written and recorded by American rappers Eminem, J-Black and Masta Ace for the Yosumi Records compilation album Game Over (2000). The song was produced by DJ Rob and is a remix of Eminem's verse on "Hustlers & Hardcore" from Domingo's 1999 album Behind the Doors of the 13th Floor.

The song samples the soundtrack "Sacrifice" from the 1998 video game SoulCalibur, which was originally composed by Takanori Otsuka. It was released as a single on April 22, 2002 in Europe, charting in countries such as France and Switzerland.

Formats and track listings
 12-inch vinyl single
 "Hellbound"  – 3:58
 "Rap 2K1"  – 3:47

 CD single
 "Hellbound"  – 3:58
 "Spread It Out"  – 3:03
 "Rap 2K1"  – 3:47

Charts

References

2000 songs
2002 singles
Eminem songs
Songs written by Eminem